Melanocorypha is a small genus of birds in the lark family. The current genus name, Melanocorypha is from Ancient Greek melas, "black", and koruphos a term used by ancient writer for a now unknown bird, but here confused with korudos, "lark".

Taxonomy and systematics
Established by Friedrich Boie in 1828, the genus Melanocorypha has five extant and at least three extinct species.

Extant species
There are five species recognized in the genus:

Extinct species
There is at least three fossil species included in this genus:
 †Melanocorypha serdicensis (late Miocene from Hrabarsko, Bulgaria)
 †Melanocorypha donchevi (late Pliocene from Varshets, Bulgaria)
 †Melanocorypha minor (Pliocene of Beremend, Hungary)

Former species
Formerly, some authorities classified the following species as belonging to the genus Melanocorypha:
 Thick-billed lark (as Melanocorypha clot-bey)
 Bar-tailed lark (as Melanocorypha cinctura)
 White-winged lark (as Melanocorypha leucoptera or Melanocorypha sibirica)

Description
Melanocorypha larks are large, robust birds, 16.5–20 cm long with strong thick bills. Some have the typically undistinguished lark plumage, mainly streaked greyish-brown above and white below, but the, black and white-winged larks have distinctive male plumages. Several species have large black patches on the breast sides.

In flight they show broad wings and a shortish tail. The songs of most species are like that of the skylark.

Distribution and habitat
The members of Melanocorypha occur mainly in temperate Asia from Turkey through central Asia to China, but the calandra lark also has an extensive European distribution around the Mediterranean. These larks are mostly partially migratory, moving relatively short distances from the coldest parts of their ranges. Several species are very rare vagrants to western Europe.

These are birds of open cultivation, steppe or semi-desert. They nest on the ground and the young are precocial. The food is seeds supplemented with insects especially in the breeding season. They are gregarious outside the breeding season.

References

 
Bird genera